Palčje (in older sources Paličje) is a village east of Pivka in the Inner Carniola region of Slovenia.

Geography
North of the village lies an intermittent lake named Lake Palčje. The highest elevations are in the Javornik Hills in the far eastern part of the settlement's territory, at Kozlovka Peak (Vrh Kozlovke), Mount Kalič, and Mount Lamovšek above the small Prevale Valley.

Name
Palčje was attested in written sources in 1498 as Palitschach. The medieval transcription indicates that today's name (a neuter singular) is derived from the accusative plural demonym *Paličane, derived from the common noun *palič, likely meaning 'small lake' (cognate with Lake Palić, Serbia), a diminutive of the Slavic noun palъ, preserved in the Slovene common noun pal 'mud' (and cognate with German Pfuhl 'puddle', English pool). The name thus refers to Lake Palčje north of the settlement.

Church
The local church, built on the central village square, is dedicated to Saint Nicholas and belongs to the Parish of Trnje.

References

External links

Palčje on Geopedia

Populated places in the Municipality of Pivka